HMS Ringdove was one of three Royal Navy Linnet-class minelayers built in 1938. She saw service as a merchant escort during the Norwegian campaign of World War II and remained in service until she was sold to Pakistan in 1951 to serve as a pilot vessel.

References
 Jane's Fighting Ships 1939, p. 98

External links
 HMS Ringdove (M 77) at uboat.net

Linnet-class minelayers
Ships built in Leith
1938 ships
World War II minelayers of the United Kingdom